Noah Raveyre (born 22 June 2005) is a French professional footballer who plays as a goalkeeper for  club Saint-Étienne.

Club career 
Born in Le Puy-en-Velay, France, and growing up in the nearby Vals-près-le-Puy, Noah Raveyre started playing football in the local Le Puy Foot, before he joined Saint-Étienne in June 2018, a club he supported since his early childhood, as did his family.

Noah Raveyre made his professional debut for AS Saint-Étienne on the 20 August 2022, coming on as a substitute in a 6–0 Ligue 2 loss against Le Havre, replacing Victor Lobry as his side was already 3–0 down, having received three red cards, including one for goalkeeper Etienne Green.

International career 
A French youth international, Raveyre was selected with France for the 2022 Under-17 Euro in April 2022. The replacing goalkeeper behind , he only played the last pool game, as his team won the championship against the likes of Germany, Portugal and Netherlands.

Honours
France U17
UEFA European Under-17 Championship: 2022

References

External links

2005 births
Living people
French footballers
France youth international footballers
Association football goalkeepers
People from Le Puy-en-Velay
AS Saint-Étienne players
Ligue 2 players
Championnat National 3 players